Clifford Smailes (1930–2005) was an Australian rugby league footballer who played in the 1950s.

Cliff 'Cec' Smailes played for the South Sydney Rabbitohs for four years between 1950 and 1953. He won a premiership with the club when he played wing in the 1950 Grand Final. Smailes also played in the Souths team that were runners up in 1952 and scored a try in the match. He played one season at Western Suburbs Magpies in 1956 before retiring.

Cliff Smailes died on 13 July 2005, aged 75.

References

1930 births
2005 deaths
South Sydney Rabbitohs players
Western Suburbs Magpies players
Australian rugby league players
Place of birth missing
Rugby articles needing expert attention
Rugby league wingers
Rugby league players from New South Wales